Nanterre-Université station is an RER and SNCF train station in Nanterre, Hauts-de-Seine.

External links

 

Réseau Express Régional stations in Hauts-de-Seine
Railway stations in Hauts-de-Seine